A train ride or miniature train consists of miniature trains capable of carrying people. Some are considered amusement rides and some are located in amusement parks and municipal parks. Backyard railroads and ridable miniature railways run on tracks, and especially if the service is provided by a non-commercial hobbyist club, their trains may be exact scale models, often with a live steam locomotive. Some train rides are kiddie rides, which are commercial children's rides that often use simple, colorful equipment with the driving mechanism hidden under vacuum-formed plastic covers. Trackless trains do not use tracks and usually consist of railroad-like cars towed behind an ordinary, or modified motor vehicle. This type of ride is often used for sightseeing tours. Some roller coasters like the Big Thunder Mountain Railroad attractions in several Disney parks resemble train rides, but may not be available to children under a certain age or minimum height.

History 
One early maker of miniature train rides was Paul Allen Sturtevant, who began building model trains as rides for children in the 1930s. Sturtevant began this craft as a hobby, later making them for rental to department stores and eventually producing them in a plant in Addison, Illinois until the demands of World War II shifted production away from consumer goods.

Gallery

See also

 Minimum-gauge railway
 Rail transport in Walt Disney Parks and Resorts
 Ridable miniature railway

References 

Amusement rides based on rail transport